Codex (February 28, 1977 – August 20, 1984) was an American thoroughbred racehorse who won the 1980 Preakness Stakes. He was foaled in Florida out of the Minnesota Mac mare, Roundup Rose, sired by the 1969 American Horse of the Year, Arts And Letters.

Triple Crown races
Trained by D. Wayne Lukas, Codex was considered the dominant 3-year-old colt in California after winning the 1980 Santa Anita Derby and Hollywood Derby. The horse's owner, John Nerud, believed Triple Crown races could harm a horse and did not allow Lukas to nominate Codex for the 1980 Kentucky Derby.

Lukas initially declined to nominate Codex for the 1980 Preakness Stakes but the horse was entered accidentally by Lukas' 22-year-old son, Jeff, who worked as the assistant trainer. Codex, ridden by Ángel Cordero Jr., beat the Kentucky Derby-winning filly, Genuine Risk by 4 lengths in the 1980 Preakness Stakes, becoming Lukas' first Triple Crown-race winner. The victory was challenged by Genuine Risk's owners on grounds of deliberate interference by Cordero. Television replays showed Cordero swing Codex wide and possibly brush against Genuine Risk. One of Codex's lawyers, Arnold M. Weiner, displayed photos showing the horses almost feet apart in contrast to the television footage. After testimony by dozens of witnesses, the Maryland Racing Commission ruled that any contact was incidental and allowed the result to stand. The controversy increased media attention on the upcoming Belmont Stakes as a rivalry between Codex and Genuine Risk.

At the 1980 Belmont Stakes in sloppy conditions, Codex finished in seventh place. to Temperence Hill; Genuine Risk finished second.

Retirement
Codex was retired after a career of six wins in fifteen starts. Codex produced  three good crops of foals before being found in his stall, paralyzed.  On August 20, 1984, he was euthanized.

From Codex's 1982 (first) crop came Tartan Stable's Coup de Fusil who emulated her sire by winning three straight Grade I races. From his 1983 crop, came the Grade I winner Badger Land. The 1984 (last) crop was highlighted by Lost Code, who won several Grade 1 races.

Breeding

References

1977 racehorse births
1984 racehorse deaths
Preakness Stakes winners
Racehorses bred in Florida
Racehorses trained in the United States
American Grade 1 Stakes winners
Thoroughbred family 9-c
Chefs-de-Race